A set-in neck (often shortened to set neck) is the traditional form of joining the neck of a stringed instrument with its body.  This is typically done with a tightly fitted mortise-and-tenon or dovetail joint, secured with hot hide glue. Among its qualities are a warm tone, long sustain, and a large surface area to transmit string vibration, leading to a "live" feeling instrument.  In guitars it also often allows superior access to top frets closest to the body.

It is a common belief that this yields a stronger body-to-neck connection than an inexpensive mechanically joined bolt-on neck, though some luthiers believe a well-executed bolt-on neck joint is equally strong and provides similar neck-to-body contact.  However, neither of these joints is as strong as a neck-through construction, the third of the common methods of neck attachment, which requires more material and is usually found only on high-end solid body guitars.

Set-in necks are the most popular on acoustic guitars. Almost all major acoustic guitar manufacturers (notable exceptions being Taylor Guitars, Godin Guitars, Collings Guitars) use set-in necks and have applied this method also to their electric guitars, for example Gibson. With hollow body set-in neck electric guitars of the 1940s being rather expensive to buy and repair, newcomer Fender in 1950 introduced electric guitars that were easier to manufacture, combining a simple solid body with a bolt-on neck. Fender also introduced the electric bass guitar by adding a longer neck bolted to a solid guitar body.

In rare cases, makers use other solutions. Babicz Guitars makes a mechanically joined neck that can be "wound" up or down to adjust action height.

Glue 
Set-in necks are traditionally and best secured with hot hide glue - which may be re-heated to allow convenient disassembly.  White and yellow PVA glues are inferior alternatives. Epoxy and Cyanoacrylate should never be used.

Advantages 
Typically cited advantages of set-in neck include:

 Warmer tone (acoustic guitars only)
 More sustain (acoustic guitars only) 
 Often, better access to top frets compared bolt-on necks that use a square metal plate
 Because the increased surface area results in more transmission of strings vibration, set in necks can feel more "alive" than if bolted on.

Disadvantages 
 Certain models seem prone to neck breakage - though this may be due to weaker neck wood (mahogany instead of maple).
 Harder and more expensive to mass manufacture than bolt-on necks
 Harder and more expensive to repair or service because the glue must be steamed or melted with a hot knife
 No control over the neck-to-body angle; changing it requires a luthier to disassemble  and re-glue the neck.

References

External links
 Glue comparison chart at frets.com

Guitar neck joints